Claude Frederic T'Serclaes, Count of Tilly, was a soldier and later general in the Dutch States Army.

Early life 
He was born in 1648 to Jean Werner T'Serclaes Tilly Marbais and Marie Françoise de Montmorency Robecq. He was a younger brother of Albert Octave who served Philip V of Spain. The grandfather of these brothers was a younger brother of Johann Tserclaes, Count of Tilly of the Thirty Years War.

Military service
In 1667 Tilly entered Spanish service, but switched to Dutch service in 1672, even though he was a Catholic. In the Dutch army he took part in the Franco-Dutch War, Nine Years' War and the War of the Spanish Succession. In the latter, together with the Lord of Slangenburg, he commandeded a small surrounded Dutch army at the Battle of Ekeren. They broke out and defeated a much larger Franco-Spanish force. When field marshal Lord Overkirk died in 1708, Tilly became supreme commander of the Dutch army in the Netherlands. He was informally made field marshal in 1701 by Leopold I, but the Dutch States General didn't make that position official, because that would offend the Frisians who wanted their stadtholder, the Prince of Orange in that position. Together with Marlborough and Eugene of Savoy, as head of the Dutch forces, Tilly defeated the French at Malplaquet, although the Dutch army suffered very heavy losses that day. During the battle he commanded the cavalry on the allied left and didn't participate in the Dutch infantry assault led by the Prince of Orange.

After the Peace of Utrecht

Tilly was rewarded the post of governor of Namur in 1713. The next year he was transferred to the same position in 's-Hertogenbosch and in 1718 he was awarded with the governorship of the fortress town of Maastricht.

Personal life
Tilly married Anne Antoinette d'Aspremont-Lynden countess of Reckheim. Anne often stayed with him in the field. In 1723 Tilly died and was buried at the Basilica of Saint Servatius in Maastricht.

References

Sources 
 
 
 
 
 

1648 births
1723 deaths
Dutch generals
17th-century Dutch military personnel
Dutch army commanders in the War of the Spanish Succession
18th-century Dutch military personnel
Dutch military personnel of the Nine Years' War